Poise may mean:

 Poise (unit), a measure of viscosity
 A concept similar to gracefulness

 Ferdinand Poise (1828–1892), French composer

See also

 
 Pose (disambiguation)
 Posies (disambiguation)